The Pursuit of Nappyness is the fourth studio album by American hip hop quintet Nappy Roots from Kentucky. It was released on June 15, 2010 under Nappy Roots Entertainment Group record label's partnership with Fontana Distribution. The album features guest appearances from Aleon Craft, CHOPS and Je'kob Washington.

Track listing

Personnel 
William Rahsaan Hughes – main artist
Melvin Adams – main artist
Ronald Wilson – main artist
Brian Scott – main artist
Vito Jermaine Tisdale – main artist
Scott Robert Jung – featured artist (track 14), additional vocals (track 11), producer (tracks: 6, 11, 14, 16)
Marcus "Aleon Craft" Thomas – featured artist (track 11), additional vocals (track 15)
Je'kob Washington – featured artist & producer (track 4)
Elizabeth Woodward – additional vocals (tracks: 10, 13)
Penelope Magnet – additional vocals (track 12)
Ellie Perry – additional vocals (track 3)
Jess Evans – acoustic guitar (track 10)
DJ KO – producer (tracks: 3, 5, 8, 10, 13)
PhiveStarr – producer (tracks: 3, 5, 8, 10, 13)
Elijah "LX" Harvey – producer (track 12)
Ernest Franklin – producer (track 9)
D. Focis – producer (track 2)
Q. Smith – producer (track 7)
Cloud 9 – producer (track 1)
Nikolai Prange – additional producer (track 5)
Silent Riot – additional producer (track 1)
Sheldon "Dutch" John – executive producer
Paul Diaz – executive producer
Blake Harden – engineering
Vance Vexed – engineering
Randall Lumpkin – mastering
Chris V. Weeks – project manager
Laboris Louden – art direction, layout
Warren Griffin, Jr. – A&R
Ellen Chamberlain – A&R

Charts

References

External links
Nappy Roots – The Pursuit Of Nappyness at AllMusic
Nappy Roots – The Pursuit Of Nappyness at Discogs

2010 albums
Nappy Roots albums